Georgy Petrovich Razumovsky (born 19 January 1936) is a Soviet politician who was a high-ranking official in the Communist Party of the Soviet Union (CPSU). He was a protégé of Mikhail Gorbachev, serving as Chairman of the Party Building and Cadre Work Commission and Head of the Party Building and Cadre Work.

References

1936 births
Living people
Central Committee of the Communist Party of the Soviet Union members
People from Krasnodar
Politburo of the Central Committee of the Communist Party of the Soviet Union members
Secretariat of the Central Committee of the Communist Party of the Soviet Union members